Archambaud IX of Bourbon (died 15 January 1249), called "Le Jeune" ("The Young"), was a ruler (sire) of Bourbonnais in the modern region of Auvergne, France.

He was the son of Archambaud VIII of Bourbon.  He married Yolande I, Countess of Nevers. They had:
Matilda II, Countess of Nevers (d. 1262)
Agnes, Lady of Bourbon (1237 - 7 September 1288); married Jean of Burgundy, Count of Charolais, the son of Hugh IV, Duke of Burgundy.

He died in Cyprus on 15 January 1249 en route to Egypt in support of the Seventh Crusade.

See also
 House of Dampierre
 French Wikipedia article on House of Dampierre

References

Sources

1249 deaths
House of Dampierre
Christians of the Seventh Crusade
Year of birth unknown
Deaths in Cyprus
13th-century French people